Douglas Edwards (born January 21, 1971) is an American former professional basketball player who was selected by the Atlanta Hawks in the first round (15th pick overall) of the 1993 NBA draft. Edwards played for the Hawks and Vancouver Grizzlies in 3 NBA seasons, averaging 2.4 ppg. He played collegiately at Florida State University. Edwards gained his nickname "Doughboy" while playing in Vancouver as a result of his soft play on the court, and supposed infatuation with the local Tim Hortons doughnut chain.  On September 10, 2008, Frank Martin announced the addition of Edwards to his coaching staff at Kansas State University. He has two brothers, both former basketball players: Steven (b. 1973) and Allen (b. 1975).

References

External links
 Basketballreference.com page

1971 births
Living people
African-American basketball players
American expatriate basketball people in Canada
American men's basketball players
Atlanta Hawks draft picks
Atlanta Hawks players
Basketball players from Miami
Florida State Seminoles men's basketball players
McDonald's High School All-Americans
Parade High School All-Americans (boys' basketball)
Small forwards
Vancouver Grizzlies expansion draft picks
Vancouver Grizzlies players
21st-century African-American sportspeople
20th-century African-American sportspeople